Zapadny is a rural locality (a village) in Kashkalashinsky Selsoviet, Blagovarsky District, Bashkortostan, Russia. The population was 256 as of 2010. There are 6 streets.

Geography 
Zapadny is located 27 km northeast of Yazykovo (the district's administrative centre) by road. Vostochny is the nearest rural locality.

References 

Rural localities in Blagovarsky District